The 1984 Buffalo Bills season was the franchise's 15th season in the National Football League, and the 25th overall. The team started the season with eleven consecutive losses before an upset home win over Dallas in Week 12. The 1984 Bills gave up a team-record 454 points on defense, an average of more than 28 per game. The Bills gave up 30+ points eight times and allowed fewer than 20 points in a game only three times all season. The Bills also allowed sixty quarterback sacks, for a total of 554 yards, the most-ever at the time. The Bills’ 4,341 total yards gained was second-worst in the league in 1984 (only the Colts gained fewer total yards). The 1984 Bills are one of only two NFL teams to have been outscored by 25 points six different times during the season. This season is notable for being Pete Carroll’s first NFL coaching experience. The Bills failed to win a single road game.

Offseason

Uniform change
For the third time in team history, the Bills changed their helmets. While keeping the streaking buffalo logo from the second change, the Bills changed their helmet color from white to red. They would keep the red helmet through the 2010 season. It was the Bills first major change to their helmets since changing from the "standing Bison" to the streaking buffalo before the 1974 season. Since three of the Bills' four AFC Eastern division opponents—Miami, Indianapolis and New England—then had white helmets (the Jets wore green helmets, but would wear white ones from 1998-2018; the Patriots have used silver helmets since 1993), "it was easier for [Ferguson] to distinguish and that's the reason why we made the switch." Ferguson had thrown a high number of interceptions over the previous two seasons, and coach Kay Stephenson hoped it would help the quarterback reduce them. Ironically, 1984 was Ferguson's last year with the Bills, and only year with the red helmets; Ferguson, after 107 consecutive starts dating to the 1977 season (at the time tied with the league record), was benched in favor of Joe Dufek on September 30. Ferguson's interception total actually increased compared to the previous year, and he would go on to play for at least three more teams (Tampa Bay Buccaneers, Indianapolis Colts and Canadian football's San Antonio Texans) that all had white helmets.

The Bills wore white jerseys for all 1984 home games, the only time they have done so in franchise history. Buffalo wore white at home occasionally every other year from 1980-86, and has done so since 2011.

NFL draft

Notre Dame running back Greg Bell made the Pro Bowl in his rookie season; he was later traded to the Los Angeles Rams in the blockbuster three-team Eric Dickerson trade. Defensive end Sean McNanie played for the team for four of his seven NFL seasons. Punter John Kidd played his first six seasons with Buffalo; his career lasted a total of 15 seasons.

Personnel

Staff

Roster

Regular season

Schedule

Note: Intra-division opponents are in bold text.

Game summaries

Week 3 (Monday, September 17, 1984): vs. Miami Dolphins 

Point spread: 
 Over/Under: 
 Time of Game: 3 hours, 15 minutes

Buffalo had now gone the first three weeks without scoring a TD in the first half.

Week 9 (Sunday, October 28, 1984): at Miami Dolphins 

Point spread: 
 Over/Under: 
 Time of Game: 2 hours, 54 minutes

Week 12

    
    
    

Greg Bell 27 Rush, 206 Yds

Week 14

Standings

Notes

References

External links
 1984 Buffalo Bills at Pro-Football-Reference.com

Buffalo Bills seasons
Buffalo Bills
Buffalo Bills